Instant Vintage is the 2002 debut album by American R&B singer and record producer Raphael Saadiq. It was his first full-length solo album after spending much of his post-Tony! Toni! Toné! career as a session player and producer. The record was a critical success but underperformed commercially, leading to Saadiq's departure from Universal Records.

Recording and production
After leaving the R&B band Tony! Toni! Toné!, Saadiq formed the group Lucy Pearl with Dawn Robinson and Ali Shaheed Muhammad while working as a producer and session player. He then began his career as a solo artist with Instant Vintage. The album was recorded in approximately seven months with producers Jake and the Phatman and Raymond Murray, among others. During the sessions, guest contributions were improvised by Angie Stone, T-Boz, Calvin Richardson, Hi-Tek, and Saadiq's older brother, Randy Wiggins. Saadiq also produced songs for other artists at the studio during this period, including Macy Gray, TLC, the Isley Brothers, Joi, and Kelly Price.

For Instant Vintage, Saadiq drew on R&B, soul, hip hop, funk, rock, jazz, and doo-wop sounds, the end result being described by him as "gospeldelic". He also recorded string and horn sections onto vinyl and scratched the recordings back into the final mix, such as on the opening track, "Doing What I Can". This song also incorporated voice recordings summarizing Saadiq's credits as a member of Tony! Toni! Toné! and Lucy Pearl. The closing track, "Skyy, Can You Feel Me", was written by him the night of the singer Aaliyah's death. Saadiq later told Billboard, "I was just feeling kind of 'angel-y' about her."

Title and packaging 
According to Rolling Stone journalist Tracy E. Hopkins, Instant Vintage was titled as a joking reference to "the disposable nature of contemporary music". For the cover photo shoot, Saadiq had the makeup artist draw a circle around his eye like Pete the Pup from the Our Gang comedy series. "It was fun to watch people make up what it meant", Saadiq recalled. "I didn't even know what the hell it meant. Later, I thought it meant that I was focused, that I had my eye on what I wanted out of my career."

Release
Instant Vintage was released by Universal Records on June 11, 2002, to poor sales. According to New York magazine's Ethan Brown, the album "quickly found fans in Europe—illicit remixes even helped spawn a new genre in the U.K. called 'pirate soul'", but it "struggled to find an audience among R&B fans accustomed to teenage superstars and a neo-soul scene that found Saadiq weird and insufficiently reverential about the seventies soul sources he riffed on". Saadiq supported the album with a promotional concert tour from May to June 2002, performing in 11 American cities; including New York, Los Angeles, and Atlanta; before embarking on another tour soon after with Joi. After the record's disappointing commercial performance, Universal ended its contract with Saadiq, who went on to release his second album Ray Ray in 2004 on his own record label, Pookie Entertainment.

Critical reception 

Instant Vintage received positive reviews from critics. Chicago Sun-Times critic Jeff Vrabel deemed it "almost unfairly effortless R&B that falls about halfway between neo-soul and Curtis Mayfield", adding that Saadiq's "array of sweet melodies, gently rolling instrumentation and melancholy street tales such as 'You're the One That I Like' shimmer with soul". Yahoo! Musics Dan Leroy called it "one of those rare [R&B] creations that makes a virtue of its sprawl" and believed Saadiq's inventive productions and lyrics distinguished his reappropriated classic soul sounds. Robert Christgau wrote in The Village Voice that the record's "structural strategy draws on erotic strategy--start off indirect and bloom into arousal, mouthwork, song. Individual tracks work that way, and so does the album as a whole, which honors the sacred memory of Tony Toni Toné more supplely than Lucy Pearl and may be more woman-friendly to boot." New York Times critic Ben Ratliff said Saadiq's original, austere approach to 1970s soul music compensated for his relatively dull singing voice, while Los Angeles Times reviewer Marc Weingarten regarded Instant Vintage as an overly modest, "long, tastefully arranged quiet storm" record. Ken Tucker was more critical in Entertainment Weekly, finding the music seductive but lacking spontaneity and burdened by "self-congratulatory lyrics" about Saadiq's musical talents and romantic faithfulness. "Saadiq's instructing us to admire him makes us think he doesn't have much else to say", Tucker said.

Instant Vintage earned Saadiq a 2003 Grammy Award nomination for Best R&B Album, while "Be Here" was nominated in the categories of Best R&B Song and Best Urban/Alternative Performance. Despite the nominations, Brown believed the record was "ignored by American critics infatuated with the minimal, mechanical sounds of the Neptunes and Timbaland" popular at the time. In 2009, Rhapsody ranked it at number 10 on the website's "Best R&B Albums of the Decade" list.

Track listing

Personnel
Credits for Instant Vintage are adapted from CD Universe.

 Raphael Saadiq – vocals, guitar, bass
 Kelvin Wooten – vocals, guitar, tuba, piano, organ, keyboards, drums, percussion
 Leslie Wilson – vocals
 Charles Veal – violin, strings
 The South Central Chamber Orchestra – strings
 Brandon Fields – tenor saxophone
 Greg Adams – trumpet
 Lee Thornburg – trumpet
 Nick Lane – trombone
 Marvin “Chanz” Parkman – keyboards
 Jake and the Phatman – drums, percussion, scratches
 Battlecat – drums
 Randall Wiggins – background vocals
 Traci Nelson – background vocals
 Gerry Brown – audio mixer
 Glenn Standridge – audio mixer
 Daniel Romero – audio mixer
 Tony Maserati – audio mixer
 D'Angelo – vocals
 Angie Stone – vocals
 Calvin Richardson – vocals
 T-Boz – vocals
 Ray Murray - vocals

Charts

References

External links
 

2002 debut albums
Raphael Saadiq albums
Universal Records albums
Albums produced by Raphael Saadiq
Quiet storm albums